The 2006–07 FIBA EuroCup Challenge was the fifth edition of Europe's fourth-tier level transnational competition for men's professional basketball clubs. The season had the participation of 16 teams. The Russian club CSK VVS-Samara won the title, after beating the Cypriot club Keravnos in the Final.

Teams of the 2006-07 FIBA EuroCup Challenge

Regular season

Quarterfinals
The quarterfinals were two-legged ties determined on aggregate score. The first legs was played on January 11, 2007. All return legs were played on January 18, 2007.

|}

Semifinals
The quarterfinals were two-legged ties determined on aggregate score. The first legs was played on February 28, 2007 and on March 1, 2007. All return legs were played on March 8.

|}

Finals

|}

Individual statistics

Points

Rebounds

Assists

References

FIBA EuroCup Challenge
FIBA